Shri-harsha (IAST: Śrīharṣa) was a 7th century Indian philosopher and poet. Shri Harsha's works concern Advaita Vedanta, Nyaya and other themes in Hindu Philosophy.

Early life 

Śrīharṣa was the son of Śrīhira and Mamalladevī. His father, Śrīhira, was a poet in the court of the Gahadavala king Vijayachandra. His father was also a guide of common people towards god with vedas, Bhagavad Gita's thoughts etc. 
His father asked Harsha at the time of his death to study well and become a pandit. He told him to use his shiksha (education) towards making life of common people divinity oriented and better. Also, he told Śrīharṣa to take thoughts of Bhagavad Gita to every one. 
Śrīharṣa went to gurukul for education and studied under Guru's guidance. He mastered all scriptures and all schools of thoughts prevailing at that time. He wrote the unparalleled book (granth), खण्डन-खण्ड-खाद्य, on Advaia Vedanta. In this book, he has refuted Nyayadarshan's principles.

Naishadha Charita 

Śrīharṣa composed the poem (kāvya) Naishadha Charita (IAST: Naiṣadhacarita) in 1174, during the reign of the Vijayachandra's son Jayachandra. According to Rājaśekhara's Prabandhakośa, upon the wide acceptance of Naishadha Charita, Śrīharṣa was dignified with the title Narabharati.

The Naishadha Charita contains erotic themes, but according to the 15th-century Jain scholar Nayachandra Suri, Śrīharṣa was actually a celibate, who had "conquered his sense organs" (jitendriya).

The Naishadha Charita was brought into Gujarat by Harihara during the reign of Vīradhavala to which Chandu Pandita in his Dipika, composed in 1296, refers to as a new poem and also to the commentary of Vidyādhara. Naishadha Charita was composed earlier than Khaṇḍanakhaṇḍakhādya in which text Sriharsha alludes to the works of Kalidasa.

Other works 

Śrīharṣa spent his later life in ascetic serenity on the banks of River Ganga. He composed several other works, none of which are now available. These include Vijayaprasasti, Chindaprasasti, Gaudorvisakulaprasasti, Sahasankacarita, Arnavavarnana and Amarakhandana. His Khaṇḍanakhaṇḍakhādya is a critique of the Śivabhaktisiddhi by Udayana, the Nyāya philosopher.

Śrīharṣa was also a philosopher; Khaṇḍanakhaṇḍakhādya or "Sugar-candy pieces of refutations," is a refutation of the doctrines of the Nyāya system of philosophy.

See also
Philosophical Reflections in the Naisadhacarita

References

Bibliography

External links
 The Naishadha-charita English translation by K. K. Handiqui  [proofread] (includes glossary)

Sanskrit poetry
Epic poems in Sanskrit
Sanskrit poets